This was the first edition of the event.

Mark Kratzmann and Jason Stoltenberg won the title, defeating Nick Brown and Kelly Jones 6–3, 2–6, 6–4 in the final.

Seeds

  Patrick Galbraith /  Jim Pugh (semifinals)
  Mark Kratzmann /  Jason Stoltenberg (champions)
  Tim Pawsat /  Laurie Warder (quarterfinals)
  Paul Annacone /  Gary Muller (quarterfinals)

Draw

Draw

External links
 Draw

Manchester Open
Manchester Open